is a Japanese former middle-distance runner who competed in the 1968 Summer Olympics.

References

1944 births
Living people
Japanese male middle-distance runners
Japanese male steeplechase runners
Olympic male steeplechase runners
Olympic athletes of Japan
Athletes (track and field) at the 1968 Summer Olympics
Asian Games gold medalists for Japan
Asian Games bronze medalists for Japan
Asian Games gold medalists in athletics (track and field)
Athletes (track and field) at the 1966 Asian Games
Athletes (track and field) at the 1970 Asian Games
Medalists at the 1966 Asian Games
Medalists at the 1970 Asian Games
Universiade medalists in athletics (track and field)
Universiade bronze medalists for Japan
Medalists at the 1967 Summer Universiade
Japan Championships in Athletics winners
20th-century Japanese people